Edson Silva, also known by the nickname Dido (born 27 June 1962), is a former Brazilian association football player who played for Campeonato Brasileiro Série A clubs Flamengo and Santos. He holds a Dutch passport.

Playing career
Dido played as a midfielder for Campeonato Brasileiro Série A clubs Flamengo and Santos. As a Santos player, he played two Série A games in 1984. He has also played in Israel, moving to the country to join Beitar Jerusalem, where he retired in 1996, and started a coaching career, as Maccabi Lazarus Holon's head coach.

Coaching career
He coached the national teams of Vietnam in 2001 and in 2002, Chinese Taipei in 2005, and was hired on 31 December 2008 to coach Bangladesh until this contract was terminated on 10 November 2009 prior to the SAFF Cup. Then he went to coach other clubs.

References

1962 births
Living people
Brazilian footballers
Association football midfielders
CR Flamengo footballers
Santos FC players
Beitar Jerusalem F.C. players
Campeonato Brasileiro Série A players
Liga Leumit players
Brazilian expatriate footballers
Brazilian expatriate sportspeople in Israel
Expatriate footballers in Israel
Brazilian football managers
Vietnam national football team managers
Chinese Taipei national football team managers
Bangladesh national football team managers
Brazilian expatriate football managers
Brazilian expatriate sportspeople in Vietnam
Brazilian expatriate sportspeople in Taiwan
Brazilian expatriate sportspeople in Bangladesh
Expatriate football managers in Israel
Expatriate football managers in Vietnam
Expatriate football managers in Taiwan
Expatriate football managers in Bangladesh